August Mälk (4 October 1900 – 19 December 1987) was an Estonian writer and politician.

Life

He attended the University of Tartu from 1923 to 1925 and then returned to Saaremaa to work as a teacher. He began his literary career while headmaster of the elementary school in Lümanda, publishing his first novel, Kesaliblik in 1926.

Mälk married Pauline Triipan in 1933. The couple had one daughter.

In 1935, Mälk achieved great success with his novel Õitsev Meri (The Flowering Sea), depicting life in a fishing village. It was the first volume of a trilogy that also included Taeva Palge All (Under the Face of Heaven) and Hea Sadam (The Good Port). In addition to his 18 novels, he also wrote plays, short stories and two books of memoirs. Several of his novels have been translated into German and Finnish.

Mälk became involved in politics in the 1930s. He was a member of the National Constituent Assembly (Rahvuskogu) in 1937. In 1938, he was elected to the Chamber of Deputies (Riigivolikogu), where he served until the Soviet invasion of Estonia in 1940.

In 1944, Mälk fled into exile in Sweden during the second Soviet invasion of Estonia. In Stockholm, he served as the chairman of the Estonian Writers Union Abroad (Välismaine Eesti Kirjanike Liit) from its founding in 1945 until 1982. He died in Stockholm in 1987.

In 2000, the Estonian Post Office issued a stamp commemorating the centenary of Mälk's birth.

Works

Novels
 Kesaliblik (1926)
 Õnnepagulane (1928)
 Hukkumine (1928)
 Läbi öö (1929)
 Kivine pesa (1932)
 Üks neistsinastest (1933)
 Surnud majad (1934)
 Õitsev meri (1935)
 Läänemere isandad (1936)
 Taeva Palgen all (1937)
 Kivid Tules (1939)
 Hea sadam (1942)
 Öised linnud (1945)
 Kodumaata (1947)
 Tea kaevule (two volumes, 1952–1953)
 Päike küla kohal (1957)
 Toomas Tamm (1959)
 Kevadine maa (1963)

Short stories and novels
 Surnu surm (1926)
 Anne-Marie (six short stories, 1927)
 Surnud elu (1929)
 Jutte lindudest (six children stories, 1934)
 Rannajutud (five short stories, 1936)
 Avatud värav. Lugu minevikust (1937)
 Mere tuultes (four short stories, 1938)
 Päike Kadunud. Jutte minevikust (five stories, 1943)
 Jumala tuultes. Viis jutustust (1949)
 Tuli sinu Isesüttiv (seven short stories, 1955)
 Jumalaga, meri! (1967)
 Project Victoria. Kuus lugu (1978)
 Tere, meri! (Collection, posthumously ed. Aarne Vinkel, 1991)

Plays
 Moodne Cain (1930)
 Vaes mehe ututall (Comedy, 1932)
 Neitsid lampidega (Comedy, 1933)
 Isad tee (1934)
 Mees merelt (1935)
 Õitsev meri (dramatization of Andres Särev, 1936)
 Vanakurja vokk (dramatization of Paul Sepp, 1936)
 Õnnega hada (comedy, under the pseudonym Kihulane Juhan, 1937)
 Sikud kaevul (Comedy, 1938)
 Taeva Palgen all (dramatization of Andres Särev, 1938)

Memoirs
 Hommikust keskpäevani. Elupilte ja mälestusi (1972)
 Peale päevapööret. Mõtteid ja mälestusi (1976)

References
Aarne Vinkel, August Mälk, Ilmamaa, Tartu, 1997 (in Estonian) .

External links
Postage stamp commemorating centenary of August Mälk's birth.

1900 births
1987 deaths
People from Saaremaa Parish
People from Kreis Ösel
Patriotic League (Estonia) politicians
Members of the Estonian National Assembly
Members of the Riigivolikogu
20th-century Estonian novelists
Estonian male novelists
Estonian male short story writers
Estonian dramatists and playwrights
Estonian World War II refugees
Refugees in Sweden
Estonian emigrants to Sweden
Burials at Skogskyrkogården